The 2012–13 Richmond Spiders men's basketball team represented the University of Richmond in National Collegiate Athletic Association (NCAA) Division I college basketball during the 2012–13 season. Richmond competed as a member of the Atlantic 10 Conference (A-10) under eighth-year head basketball coach Chris Mooney and played its home games at the Robins Center.

This season was the 100th in Richmond basketball history.

Preseason

Recruiting

100 Years celebration
The University celebrated the 100th season of Spider basketball in several ways.  Many former Spider players, coaches and teams were honored throughout the season and on January 22 the school announced their All-Time team, honored at halftime of their February 9 game against Saint Louis:

Kevin Anderson (2007–2011)
Ken Atkinson (1986–1990)
Greg Beckwith (1982–1986)
Curtis Blair (1986–1992)
Tony Dobbins (2001–2004)
David Gonzalvez (2006–2010)
Justin Harper (2007–2011)
Ed Harrison (1952–1956)
Bob McCurdy (1973–1975)
Warren Mills (1951–1955)
Johnny Moates (1964–1967)
Johnny Newman (1982–1986)
Michael Perry (1977–1981)
John Schweitz (1978–1982)
Aron Stewart (1972–1974)
Dick Tarrant - Coach
Peter Woolfolk (1984–1988)

Roster

Schedule

|-
!colspan=9| Regular Season

|-
!colspan=9| 2013 Atlantic 10 men's basketball tournament

|-
!colspan=9| 2013 College Basketball Invitational

References

External links
 100 Years of Richmond basketball site

Richmond Spiders men's basketball seasons
Richmond
Richmond
Richmond
Richmond